USCGC Charles David Jr is the seventh .
Upon her commissioning she was assigned to serve in Key West, Florida, the first of six vessels to be based there.
She was delivered to the Coast Guard, for testing, on August 17, 2013.
She was officially commissioned on November 16, 2013.

Namesake

The vessel is named after Charles Walter David Jr., who served as a Steward's Mate 1st Class in the United States Coast Guard.
David was serving aboard  escorting a convoy that included .
David was one of the Comanche crew members who volunteered to dive into the frigid waters to rescue exhausted crew and passengers from Dorchester.  David also rescued several other Comanche crew members, who grew exhausted.

David came down with pneumonia after the exertion of the rescue, dying a few days later.  He was posthumously awarded the Navy and Marine Corps Medal.

References

Sentinel-class cutters
Ships of the United States Coast Guard
2013 ships
Ships built in Lockport, Louisiana